USS Harkness may refer to the following ships operated by the United States Navy:

, was a survey ship launched in 1942 and decommissioned in 1958
, was a survey ship launched in 1968 and transferred to the Maritime Administration in 1994

United States Navy ship names